Xsolla is a global video game commerce company headquartered in Sherman Oaks, Los Angeles, California. It was founded in 2005 by Aleksandr Agapitov, and is incorporated as a California Corporation (US company) with subsidiaries around the world.

Xsolla’s products include digital tools which help with in-game payments and enable alternative payment systems to be used for digital transactions.

According to research conducted by Goldman Sachs and Bank of America, Xsolla could be worth up to $3 billion. In 2020, the company's revenue was $67 million.

The clients of the company include Twitch, Smite, Epic/Fortnite, Phoenix Labs, Roblox, Warner Bros, Nexters, WEMADE, Gaijin, NetEase Games.

The company's offices are located in Sherman Oaks (USA), Raleigh (USA), Kuala Lumpur (Malaysia), Berlin (Germany), Seoul (South Korea), Tsim Sha Tsui (Hong Kong), Delhi (India), London (England), Limassol (Cyprus), Shenzhen (China), Singapore, Dubai (UAE), Dublin (Ireland).

History

Beginnings 
Founded in 2005 by Alexander Agapitov, Xsolla (then 2Pay) provides payment services via local payment methods (cash kiosks, prepaid cards, money orders and e-wallets). The company was initially targeted at Russian game developers and publishers. Having added PayPal and SMS payment options, 2Pay entered the CIS (Commonwealth of Independent States) market and started its global expansion. Several years after the founding, Xsolla and its core leadership team moved to the United States and officially reincorporated as a US company California Corporation. This allowed the company to greatly expand its operations globally.

Rebranding 
In 2010, 2Pay headquarters moved to Sherman Oaks, CA. The company was renamed to Xsolla and transformed into an American company to expand its global operations.

The company expanded its business portfolio by adding numerous payment systems.

Expansion and partnerships 
January 26, 2012: Xsolla integrated ZipZap’s CashPay™ payment systems to allow for bankless, cash-based transactions for online game purchases.

August 10, 2012: Xsolla’s partnership with Openbucks enabled the use of unused gift cards from retail brands (such as Subway, Burger King, Circle K, and CVS) for game customers in the United States and Canada.

September 14, 2013: Xsolla announced the addition of the Greenlight service to the company's product roster. Greenlight allowed for game customers to suggest new payment options currently unavailable in certain games.

April 29, 2014: Xsolla announced the opening of a new office within São Paolo, Brazil. Xsolla began offering local payment methods in Brazil which included local bank transfers, cash payment systems, and prepaid cards.

March 17, 2014: Xsolla announced they were integrating their services within EVE Online to service customers in Russia, the CIS, Latin America, and Southeast Asia.

August 1, 2014: Xsolla announced that following a partnership with Twitch.tv, the company would be processing all of the streaming services’ alternative payment methods including the use of e-wallets, cash vouchers, cryptocurrencies, and local payment systems.

December 23, 2014: Xsolla partnered with PayGarden to expand its supported gift cards by over 100 major gift card brands.

May 14, 2015: Xsolla announced a partnership with merchant acquirer Secure Trading Financial Services (STFS). The goal of the partnership was to achieve faster processing of credit card payments.

May 21, 2015: Xsolla announced their collaboration with Unity in developing the Xsolla Unity SDK. The Xsolla Unity SDK would enable web-based and client-based games to integrate Xsolla’s payment methods in their games directly, rather than redirecting to a web portal or separate storefront.

April 26, 2021: Xsolla acquired advanced the data analysis company Slemma and planned to integrate all of Slemma’s tools into Xsolla’s various platforms.

August 11, 2022: Xsolla and software/services provider Adikteev announced their partnership to help mobile developers sell and monetize their games more efficiently.

October 19, 2022: Xsolla partnered with Alipay+ and integrated their suite of services to allow Asian-based gamers more accessibility when purchasing digital goods in-game.

Metaverse Project 
On February 21, 2022 Aleksandr Agapitov announced the company’s launch of X.LA, a “community-driven organization designed to democratize how creators benefit from their work by utilizing novel technologies and concepts of Web3.”
X.LA works by leveraging blockchain and Web3 technologies to enable revenue-sharing deals more accessible to creators globally through a decentralized protocol.

Products 
Xsolla’s current monetization product offerings consist of 10 gaming-specific ecommerce tools: Xsolla Pay Station, In-Game Store, Player Inventory, Subscriptions, Buy Button, Site Builder, Web Shop, NFT Checkout, Multi-Platform Publishing, Digital Distribution Hub, and Anti-fraud solution.

Xsolla Pay Station allows Xsolla partners to monetize their product by providing an interface for users around the world to pay for in-game purchases in game stores. The tool supports more than 130 world currencies.

The in-game store is a service for managing in-game purchases. The service functions as an in-game digital marketplace where players can purchase in-game and other digital items. Developers can access integrated marketing and price management tools.

Xsolla Player Inventory allows developers to track and sync customer purchases, and grant and revoke in-game items and currency from a specific user's inventory.

Xsolla’s Subscriptions allow developers to create and adjust subscription plans from a comprehensive dashboard.

Xsolla Buy Button is an ecommerce solution for game developers that supports various monetization options. It allows the purchase of game keys, virtual items, and virtual currency with either real or other virtual currencies.

Xsolla Site Builder allows developers to create sites in order to sell and promote pay-to-play games, free-to-play games, and in-game items.

Web Shop is a tool that allows mobile game developers to sell virtual items, virtual currencies and bundles using the Xsolla payment UI and store interface on their own website.

NFT Checkout allows the addition of NFTs to a game’s economy.

Anti-fraud improves fraud detection with specific in-game parameters, separates fraudulent activity from legitimate purchases, and detects serial fraudsters across games.

Xsolla currently offers three services focused on community growth and publishing support for video games: Xolla Launcher, Xsolla Login, And Xsolla’s Digital Distribution Hub.

Xsolla Funding Club is a partner search service for video game developers, investors and publishers.

Xsolla Game Investment Platform is designed for individual investors seeking co-investment strategies. The platform contains a portfolio of games ready to accept investments.

Awards
On April 5, 2022, Xsolla was announced as the winner of Mobile Games Awards “Best Service Provider” award.

On October 4, 2022, Xsolla received the Gold tier Merit Award for gaming.

Management
Aleksandr Agapitov is Xsolla’s Founder and former CEO. On February 2, 2022, Agapitov stepped down and appointed Konstantin Golubitsky as CEO. Chris Hewish is the current president of Xsolla.

Controversy 
In 2020, Bitbox Ltd. announced that it was shutting down its game Life Is Feudal: MMO, alleging that Xsolla was not paying them. This has resulted in a lawsuit between the two companies.

In 2021, Xsolla fired 150 employees based on their performance metric which was measured using big data and AI analytics.

References 

Online payments
Electronic funds transfer
Payment service providers
Financial services companies established in 2005
2005 establishments in Russia
Companies based in Los Angeles
Sherman Oaks, Los Angeles
Video game companies of the United States
Online financial services companies of the United States